Tommaso Berti (born 7 March 2004) is an Italian professional footballer who plays as a midfielder for  club Fiorentina on loan from Cesena.

Club career 
Tommaso Berti made his professional debut for Cesena on the 22 August 2021, during a 3-1 home Coppa Serie C win against Pistoiese. He made his championship debut less than a month later during a game against Imolese. In 2022, he joined Fiorentina on loan, who assigned him to their under-19s.

References

External links

2004 births
Living people
People from Cesena
Footballers from Emilia-Romagna
italian footballers
Association football midfielders
Serie C players
Cesena F.C. players
ACF Fiorentina players 
Sportspeople from the Province of Forlì-Cesena